Salt Rock State Campground is a public recreation area that preserves  of wooded riverfront along the Shetucket River in the town of Sprague, Connecticut. In 2001, the state purchased the  campground for US$750,000 from Dwight and Jean Lathrop, whose "sensitive stewardship" of the property as its previous owners was recognized in the press. The state park offers RV and tent camping sites, swimming pools, and river fishing. The state curtailed camping services in 2016, reinstating them in 2018.

References

External links
Salt Rock State Campground Connecticut Department of Energy and Environmental Protection

State parks of Connecticut
Sprague, Connecticut
Parks in New London County, Connecticut
Campgrounds in Connecticut
Protected areas established in 2001